Gausman is a surname. Notable people with the surname include:

Hal Gausman (1917–2003), American set decorator 
Kevin Gausman (born 1991), American baseball player
Russell A. Gausman (1892–1963), American set decorator

See also
Gasman (disambiguation)
Gassman